The 1988 United States Senate election in Rhode Island was held on November 8, 1988. Incumbent Republican U.S. Senator John Chafee won re-election to a third term.

Major candidates

Democratic 
 Richard Licht, Lieutenant Governor and former State Senator

Republican 
 John Chafee, U.S. Senator since 1976

Results

See also 
  1988 United States Senate elections

References 

Rhode Island
1988
1988 Rhode Island elections